was Tokugawa Iemitsu's daughter with his concubine, Ofuri no Kata (died 1640), daughter of Oka Shigemasa, also known as Jishō'in.  After Ofuri died, Chiyohime was adopted by Iemitsu's concubine, Oman no Kata (1624-1711), later Keishoin.  She married Tokugawa Mitsutomo, daimyō of Owari Domain.  In 1652, she constructed a mausoleum for her mother named Jishō'in Mausoleum, which is now located in Edo-Tokyo Open Air Architectural Museum.  She died in 1699 and was given the name .

Family
 Father: Tokugawa Iemitsu
 Mother: Ofuri no Kata (died 1640)
 Adopted Mother: Oman no Kata (1624-1711), later Eikō'in
 Husband: Tokugawa Mitsutomo
 Children: 
 Tokugawa Tsunanari
 Matsudaira Yoshiyuki (1656-1715)
 Toyohime (b.1655)
 Naohime (1658-1661)

References

1637 births
1699 deaths
Tokugawa clan